This is a timeline of the public releases or introductions of computer encryption algorithms.

References
 Horst Feistel. Block Cipher Cryptographic System, US Patent 3,798,359. Filed June 30, 1971. (IBM)
 
 Joe Kilian and Phillip Rogaway, How to protect DES against exhaustive key search (PostScript), Advances in Cryptology - Crypto '96, Springer-Verlag (1996), pp. 252–267.
 Ingrid Schaumuller-Bichl, Zur Analyse des Data Encryption Standard und Synthese Verwandter Chiffriersysteme, Ph.D. Thesis, Linz university, May 1981. (In German).
 

History of cryptography